The papal tombs in old St. Peter's Basilica were the final resting places of the popes, most of which dated from the fifth to sixteenth centuries. The majority of these tombs were destroyed during the sixteenth through seventeenth century demolition of old St. Peter's Basilica, except for one which was destroyed during the Saracen Sack of the church in 846. The remainder were transferred in part to new St. Peter's Basilica, which stands on the site of the original basilica, and a handful of other churches of Rome.

History
Along with the repeated translations from the ancient catacombs of Rome and two fourteenth century fires in the Archbasilica of Saint John Lateran, the rebuilding of St. Peter's is responsible for the destruction of approximately half of all papal tombs. As a result, Donato Bramante, the chief architect of modern St. Peter's Basilica, has been remembered as "Mastro Ruinante".

Although the original basilica's construction was begun during the reign of emperor Constantine I and completed in the fourth century, Pope Leo I (440–461) was the first pope buried in the Constantian basilica. Over the centuries, both the atrium, chapels, and the nave of the basilica were packed with papal tombs, which were juggled between different sections of the church as construction took place on each section of the basilica. All that remains of the original tombs are a few sarcophagi and sculptural fragments. Allegedly, Pope Julius II, the pope who initiated the destruction of the Constantinian basilica, wished to clear space for a "monstrous" tomb of his own by Michelangelo.

Very little is known about the placement and appearance of the original tombs: one of the most valuable accounts is that of church canon and historian Giacomo Grimaldi (a senator of Genoa and the father of Girolamo Grimaldi-Cavalleroni), who sketched the tombs as they were moved around the basilica on the way to their destruction; Grimaldi's sketches record the shape and complexity of the early tombs, many of which were three-tiered. A few destroyed papal tombs are also detailed in the writings of Alphonsus Ciacconius.

Not all popes were buried in Rome. See list of non-extant papal tombs

Papal tombs

Partially extant, moved, or rebuilt tombs are shown with a darkened background.

See also
 Index of Vatican City-related articles
 Papal tombs
 St. Peter's tomb

Notes

References 
 
 
 Reardon, Wendy J. 2004. The Deaths of the Popes. Macfarland & Company, Inc.

External links
  Information and images on papal tombs (1417 and 1799) from the Requiem project
 

Old Saint Peters
Papal tombs
History of the papacy
Sarcophagi